MV American Courage is a diesel-powered lake freighter owned and operated by Grand River Navigation. This vessel was built in 1979 at Bay Shipbuilding Company, Sturgeon Bay, Wisconsin and included self-unloading technology.

The vessel carries a variety of cargoes including limestone, coal or iron ore.

History 
The ship was built for Oglebay Norton Corporation in 1979 and named Fred R. White, Jr. for the company's former vice president and director. As Fred R. White, Jr., the vessel made its first voyage in May 1979 to on-load iron ore at Escanaba, Michigan. American Steamship Company acquired American Courage in 2006. On December 17, 2015 the end of the shipping season, American Courage was put into long term layup. The vessel re-entered service on April 12, 2019.

References

External links
 

1978 ships
Great Lakes freighters
Ships built in Sturgeon Bay, Wisconsin